The Quinnipiac Bobcats program represented Quinnipiac University during the 2016-17 NCAA Division I women's ice hockey season.

Offseason
 Taylar Cianfarano, Melissa Samoskevich, and Kenzie Prater were invited to the Team USA Development Camp, while Sarah-Eve Coutu-Godbout was invited to the Team Canada Camp.

Recruiting

2016–17 Bobcats

Schedule

|-
!colspan=12 style=""| Regular Season

|-
!colspan=12 style=""| ECAC Tournament

Awards and honors

Taryn Baumgardt, Defense, All-ECAC Third Team

References

Quinnipiac
Quinnipiac Bobcats women's ice hockey seasons
Quinnipiac